World's End is a hamlet in Berkshire, England. It is in the district of West Berkshire, near the A34 north of Newbury. To the north is the village of Beedon (where, according to the Grid Ref the 2011 Census population was included); to the south lie Downend and Chieveley. World's End is in the parish of Beedon.

References

Hamlets in Berkshire
West Berkshire District